Squid in comics may refer to:

 Squid (Marvel Comics) - a number of Marvel Comics supervillains
 Squid (DC Comics) - two different villains in DC Comics